The Borda count electoral system can be combined with an instant-runoff procedure to create hybrid election methods that are called Nanson method and Baldwin method (also called Total Vote Runoff or TVR). Both methods are designed to satisfy the Condorcet criterion, and allow for incomplete ballots and equal rankings.

Nanson method 

The Nanson method is based on the original work of the mathematician Edward J. Nanson in 1882.

Nanson's method eliminates those choices from a Borda count tally that are at or below the average Borda count score, then the ballots are retallied as if the remaining candidates were exclusively on the ballot. This process is repeated if necessary until a single winner remains.

If a Condorcet winner exists, they will be elected.  If not, (there is a Condorcet cycle) then the preference with the smallest majority will be eliminated.

Nanson's method can be adapted to handle incomplete ballots (including "plumping") and equal rankings ("bracketing"), though he describes two different methods to handle these cases: a theoretically correct method involving fractions of a vote, and a practical method involving whole numbers (which has the side effect of diminishing the voting power of voters who plump or bracket).  This then allows the use of Approval-style voting for uninformed voters who merely wish to approve of some candidates and disapprove of others.

The method can be adapted to multi-winner elections by removing the name of a winner from the ballots and re-calculating, though this just elects the highest-ranked n candidates and does not result in proportional representation.

Schwartz in 1986 studied a slight variant of Nanson's rule, in which candidates less than but not equal to the average Borda count score are eliminated in each round.

Baldwin method 

Candidates are voted for on ranked ballots as in the Borda count. Then, the points are tallied in a series of rounds. In each round, the candidate with the fewest points is eliminated, and the points are re-tallied as if that candidate were not on the ballot.

This method actually predates Nanson's, who notes it was already in use by the Trinity College Dialectic Society.

It was systematized by Joseph M. Baldwin in 1926, who incorporated a more efficient matrix tabulation and extended it to support incomplete ballots and equal rankings, by counting fractional points in such cases.

The two methods have been confused with each other in some literature.

This system has been proposed for use in the United States under the name "Total Vote Runoff", by Edward B. Foley and Eric Maskin, as a way to fix problems with the instant-runoff method in US jurisdictions that use it, ensuring majority support of the winner and electing more broadly-acceptable candidates.

Satisfied and failed criteria 

The Nanson method and the Baldwin method satisfy the Condorcet criterion. Because Borda always gives any existing Condorcet winner more than the average Borda points, the Condorcet winner will never be eliminated.

They do not satisfy the independence of irrelevant alternatives criterion, the monotonicity criterion, the participation criterion, the consistency criterion and the independence of clones criterion, while they do satisfy the majority criterion, the mutual majority criterion, the Condorcet loser criterion and the Smith criterion. The Nanson method satisfies and the Baldwin method violates reversal symmetry.

Both the Nanson and the Baldwin methods can be run in polynomial time to obtain a single winner. For the Baldwin method, however, at each stage, there might be several candidates with lowest Borda score. In fact, it is NP-complete to decide whether a given candidate is a Baldwin winner, i.e., whether there exists an elimination sequence that leaves a given candidate uneliminated.

Both methods are computationally more difficult to manipulate than Borda's method.

Use of Nanson and Baldwin 
Nanson's method was used in city elections in the U.S. town of Marquette, Michigan in the 1920s. It was formerly used by the Anglican Diocese of Melbourne and in the election of members of the University Council of the University of Adelaide. It was used by the University of Melbourne until 1983.

References 

 Duncan Sommerville (1928) "Certain hyperspatial partitionings connected with preferential voting", Proceedings of the London Mathematical Society 28(1):368–82.

Non-monotonic Condorcet methods